The 1995 Denmark Open in badminton was held in Odense, from October 12 to October 15, 1995.

Final results

References

Denmark Open
Denmark